The Olympic Hero is a 1928 American silent comedy sports film directed by Roy William Neill and starring Charles Paddock, Julanne Johnston and Crauford Kent. It incorporated some real footage from the 1924 Olympic Games.

Cast
 Charles Paddock as Charlie Patterson 
 Julanne Johnston as Mary Brown 
 Donald Stuart as Assistant Coach 
 Harvey Clark as Coach Regan 
 Crauford Kent as Man-About-Town 
 Jack Selwyn as Harold Fellows 
 Emile Chautard as Grandpa Brown 
 R.O. Pennell as Professor 
 Aileen Manning as Physical Instructress 
 Bob Maxwell as Balfor Champ 
 Raoul Paoli as French Champ

References

Bibliography
 Wiley Lee Umphlett. The Movies Go to College: Hollywood and the World of the College-life Film. Fairleigh Dickinson Univ Press, 1984.

External links

1928 films
1920s sports comedy films
1928 comedy films
American sports comedy films
American silent feature films
1920s English-language films
Films directed by Roy William Neill
American black-and-white films
1920s American films
Silent American comedy films
Silent sports comedy films